Fernando Castañeda (born 8 January 1989) is a Mexican professional boxer and the current WBC Youth World Light Welterweight Championship. Castañeda is promoted by current WBC Champion, Mexican Saúl Álvarez' company Canelo Promotions.

Professional career
In July 2011, Fernando took out world title contender Fidel Muñoz to win the WBC Youth World Light Welterweight Championship.

WBA Light Welterweight Championship
Castañeda will fight Johan Pérez for the interim WBA Light Welterweight title.

References

External links

Mexican male boxers
People from Aguascalientes City
Boxers from Aguascalientes
Welterweight boxers
Light-welterweight boxers
1989 births
Living people